Marc-André Monette (born 25 February 1981) is a former Canadian short track speed skater.

He was a silver medalist in relay competition at the 2008 World Championships. During the years 2007–2009, he was a member of the Canadian national team. At the World Cup, he finished twice second in 1000 m competitions, and had two victories as well as another four podiums in relay competitions.

External links
 Person Bio
 Athlete's Statistics

1981 births
Living people
Canadian male short track speed skaters
Universiade medalists in short track speed skating
Medalists at the 2003 Winter Universiade
21st-century Canadian people
Universiade silver medalists for Canada